Steven Emil Cherundolo (born February 19, 1979) is an American soccer coach and former player who serves as head coach of Major League Soccer side Los Angeles FC. A right-back, he was the captain of Hannover 96 of the German Bundesliga, where he spent his entire club career. He represented the United States at the 2006, 2010, and 2014 FIFA World Cups.

Early life
Born in Rockford, Illinois, Cherundolo grew up in San Diego, California, and attended Mt. Carmel High School in Rancho Peñasquitos. As a youth, he played for the La Jolla Nomads club team, which won the California state championship six times with him.

Before joining Hannover, Cherundolo enrolled at the University of Portland and played for the Pilots soccer team from 1997 to 1998. In his freshman season, he was the West Coast Conference Freshman of the Year.

Playing club career

Cherundolo joined Hannover 96, then playing in the 2. Bundesliga, for the end of the 1998–1999 season and quickly received first-team action, playing in four games his first year. Coming into the 1999–2000 season, Cherundolo established himself at the right back position, starting consistently before suffering a knee injury that kept him out until the end of the season and ended his chances of playing for the U.S. Olympic team. He continued to establish his place in the team during the 2000–2001 season, earning playing time in 18 games, including 10 starts. In the 2001–02 season, he started 30 of 34 games for the team as he helped the team gain promotion to the Bundesliga. Cherundolo maintained his position in the 2002–03 season, starting 33 games for the team, while collecting three assists. In the 2003–04 season, he continued his consistent play, appearing in 33 games for the club. Premier League side Bolton Wanderers agreed to a deal with Hannover for Cherundolo in 2005, but he declined, opting to remain in Germany. He signed another contract extension with Hannover in the summer of 2007.

Cherundolo established himself as a leader at Hannover and was appointed team captain shortly before the start of the 2010–11 season. He set the team record for Bundesliga appearances in the second to last game of the 2012–13 season. As of 2013, Cherundolo was the longest serving player in the Bundesliga. On March 19, 2014, Cherundolo announced his retirement from soccer citing failure to recover from a long term knee injury as the main reason he left the game.

International career
Cherundolo parlayed his success in the Bundesliga into a role with the United States national team. Cherundolo made his debut against Jamaica on September 8, 1999. Although he was on the roster for the 2002 FIFA World Cup (a late injury replacement for Chris Armas), Cherundolo himself was injured in training shortly before the event began and was unable to play. In the 2005 CONCACAF Gold Cup, Cherundolo sustained a knee injury from a tackle that prematurely ended his participation in the tournament. On March 22, 2006, Cherundolo played in a friendly match with the national team against Germany, whose roster included some teammates from Hannover 96. He scored his first international goal in the 4–1 loss.

On May 2, 2006, Cherundolo was named to the U.S. roster for the FIFA World Cup in Germany. On June 12, 2006, for the first time, aged 26, Cherundolo made his debut in a FIFA World Cup match against the Czech Republic, playing in the first half for the U.S., who started the tournament with a 3–0 loss. Five days later, in the second match against Italy (who later won the tournament), Cherundolo played the full 90 minutes, helping the team to a 1–1 draw at Fritz-Walter-Stadion in Kaiserslautern. After a loss against Ghana in the final match in the group, the U.S. was eliminated from the tournament, finishing the group in last place with just one point.

Cherundolo missed the 2007 CONCACAF Gold Cup due to an injury. He also missed out on the 2009 FIFA Confederations Cup due to another injury, but returned to captain the U.S. during the 2009 CONCACAF Gold Cup.

Cherundolo was one of seven defenders named to the U.S. squad for the 2010 FIFA World Cup in South Africa. He was given the number 6. In the first match of Group C against England, Cherundolo was in the starting lineup and played the full 90 minutes in a 1–1 draw at Royal Bafokeng Stadium. On June 18, he retained his position for the second match, playing in the entire game against Slovenia, which finished in a 2–2 draw, with the U.S. coming back from 2–0 down. In the 48th minute of the match, Cherundolo assisted Landon Donovan who beat Slovenian goalkeeper Samir Handanović with a powerful shot. In the final match of the group, Cherundolo again started at right back as the U.S. beat Algeria with a last-minute winner, scored by Donovan, to finish the group in first place with five points. U.S. would lose in the Round of 16 against Ghana, 2–1 after extra time. Cherundolo was an ever-present figure in this competition for the United States, playing the entire 390 minutes.

Coaching career
Following his retirement announcement, Cherundolo remained with Hannover 96 as an assistant coach for Hannover's amateur team. On April 20, 2015, he was officially promoted to assistant coach of Hannover 96's first team. After the end of the 2014–15 season, Cherundolo became the head coach of Hannover's U–17 academy team.

In January 2018, Cherundolo moved to VfB Stuttgart and became assistant of the new head coach Tayfun Korkut. In November 2018, Cherundolo was named to the coaching staff of the United States national team by interim coach Dave Sarachan.

In an August 2020 interview with the Narrowing the Angle soccer podcast, Cherundolo said he "would love to coach" the US national team and also expressed interest in coaching in Major League Soccer. On August 20, 2020, it was announced that Cherundolo had joined the Germany national youth football team as an assistant coach for their U-15 team.

On March 12, 2021, Cherundolo was named head coach of USL Championship side Las Vegas Lights FC.

Cherundolo was announced as head coach of Los Angeles FC in Major League Soccer on January 3, 2022. On October 2, 2022 Cherundolo broke the record for most wins as a first-year head coach in Major League Soccer history with 21 wins after Los Angeles FC defeated the Portland Timbers 2–1. The record was previously held by former Los Angeles FC coach Bob Bradley in 1998 with 20 wins, when Bradley was the head coach of the Chicago Fire. The match also clinched the Supporters' Shield for LAFC, the second in team history, and made Cherundolo the third coach to lead a team to the Shield in his first season in MLS. LAFC would go on to win their first MLS Cup title against the Philadelphia Union in MLS Cup 2022.

Personal life
Cherundolo speaks English and German fluently, having spent his entire professional career in Germany. A popular figure with Hannover fans, he is known as "Dolo" and affectionately nicknamed the "Mayor of Hannover". Cherundolo married Mandy Rosier on New Year's Eve 2009 at the local St. Joseph Catholic parish church. After his retirement from soccer, he has resided with his family in Großburgwedel, near Hannover. In 2021, Cherundolo was elected to the National Soccer Hall of Fame as a player inductee.

Career statistics

Club

International

Scores and results list the United States' goal tally first, score column indicates score after each Cherundolo goal

Coaching statistics

Honors

Player
Hannover 96
 2. Bundesliga: 2001–02

United States
CONCACAF Gold Cup: 2005

Manager
Los Angeles FC
MLS Cup: 2022
Supporters' Shield: 2022

See also
List of one-club men in association football

References

External links

Kinderherz Hannover e.V. – Children's charity organization, co-founded by Cherundolo

1979 births
Living people
American soccer players
American expatriate soccer players
American expatriate soccer players in Germany
2002 FIFA World Cup players
2003 FIFA Confederations Cup players
2005 CONCACAF Gold Cup players
2006 FIFA World Cup players
2009 CONCACAF Gold Cup players
2010 FIFA World Cup players
2011 CONCACAF Gold Cup players
CONCACAF Gold Cup-winning players
Hannover 96 players
Bundesliga players
2. Bundesliga players
United States men's international soccer players
University of Portland alumni
Portland Pilots men's soccer players
Soccer players from Illinois
Sportspeople from Rockford, Illinois
United States men's youth international soccer players
United States men's under-20 international soccer players
United States men's under-23 international soccer players
Hannover 96 non-playing staff
VfB Stuttgart non-playing staff
Association football defenders
Las Vegas Lights FC coaches
USL Championship coaches
Los Angeles FC coaches
Major League Soccer coaches
National Soccer Hall of Fame members